Tomáš Petrášek (born 2 March 1992) is a Czech professional footballer who plays as a centre-back for Raków Częstochowa.

Club career
Petrášek started his career with Hradec Králové.

International career
He made his national team debut on 7 October 2020 in a friendly against Cyprus.

Honours

Club
Raków Częstochowa
Polish Cup: 2020–21, 2021–22
 Polish Super Cup: 2021

References

1992 births
Living people
Czech footballers
Czech Republic international footballers
Association football defenders
FK Kolín players
Raków Częstochowa players
Ekstraklasa players
I liga players
II liga players
FK Viktoria Žižkov players
Czech expatriate footballers
Expatriate footballers in Poland
People from Rychnov nad Kněžnou
Sportspeople from the Hradec Králové Region